Elvira Pančić (born 14 May 1980) is a Serbian sprinter. She competed in the women's 4 × 100 metres relay at the 2000 Summer Olympics representing Yugoslavia.

References

1980 births
Living people
Athletes (track and field) at the 2000 Summer Olympics
Serbian female sprinters
Olympic athletes of Yugoslavia
Place of birth missing (living people)
Olympic female sprinters